The rainwater killifish (Lucania parva) is a small silvery fish with yellow flashes and diamond shaped scales that is widespread from Cape Cod, Massachusetts, through to Tampico, Mexico. It is commonly found in large numbers in fresh to brackish estuarine environments.  It feeds on tiny crustaceans, mosquito larvae, small worms, and mollusks. It can reach up to 62 mm (2.44 inches).

Description
Coloration: Body not barred (Hubbs et al. 1991). Back silvery to light green, with a narrow, dark middorsal stripe. Scales on sides outlined in melanophores, creating cross-hatched  pattern, which is especially prominent in breeding males. Forward and upper surfaces of the  head speckled with melanophores, which also extend onto the underside of the lower jaw. Belly  and undersides of body are silver. Fins generally lack pigmentation, except for some melanophores along the rays. In breeding males, dorsal fin has a black anterior blotch and dark marginal and basal bands that may include orange pigmentation. Caudal, anal, and pelvic  fins red to orange, with black marginal bands (Gunter 1950; Simpson and Gunter 1956; Ross 2001).

Counts: 10+ dorsal fin rays; 8-13 scale rows from pelvic origin to isthmus; 30 or fewer  longitudinal scale rows (Hubbs et al. 1991); 27 (26-28) lateral scales; 11 (9-13) dorsal fin  rays; 13 (12-14) pectoral fin rays; 6 (4-7) pelvic fin rays; 9 (8-13) anal fin rays; 16 (15- 18) caudal fin rays; 8 (5-9) gill rakers on 1st arch (Sublette et al. 1990).

Body shape:  Body deep, rather compressed; head flattened above, tapering to vertically  rounded, blunt snout (Hardy 1978). Body depth contained four times in standard length (Hubbs et al. 1991). Body axis straight (Sublette et al. 1990).

Mouth position: Supraterminal, oblique; mouth small; obliquely sloped, protruding lower jaw (Sublette et al. 1990).

External morphology: Distance from origin of dorsal fin to end of hypural plate more than  distance from origin of dorsal fin to preopercle (Hubbs et al. 1991); dorsal and caudal fins rounded; pectorals, pelvic, anal fins rounded at apex (Sublette et al. 1990). Males develop  prickly contact organs on top and sides of head and on side of body between dorsal and anal  fin bases (Foster 1967; Collette 1977). Female with membranous sheath surrounding genital opening (Sublette et al. 1990).

Internal morphology: Teeth conical and simple (Hubbs et al. 1991). Premaxillary and mandibular teeth uniserial or irregular, occasionally with a few strong inner teeth (Sublette  et al. 1990).

Diet

Simpson and Gunter (1956) and Harrington and Harrington (1961) reported diet items including  larval crustaceans (mainly cyclopoid and harpacticoid copepods), mosquito larvae, small worms, and mollusks. Harrington and Harrington (1961) noted that the species heavily predates both larvae and pupae of saltmarsh mosquitoes.

Habitat

Found in salt marshes, bays, and lagoons from Cape Cod, Massachusetts to Tampico, Mexico  (Duggins 1980a); common in freshwaters of St. John's River system, Florida (Burgess 1977), and  Rio Grande and Pecos River in Texas and New Mexico (Duggins 1980a). Lucania parva is a  schooling species (Hardy 1978).

Reproduction and life cycle

Spawning season: In Texas, females began ripening in February, and a few were gravid in July. Peak spawning is in May and June (males displayed breeding coloration from February into June, or July, with greatest color intensity in May; Gunter 1950); may occur in earlier in the spring (Simpson and Gunter 1956). Sublette et al. (1990) reports spawning in New Mexico from spring – fall, at least in the southern portion of the state.

Spawning location: During spawning, males and females swim into vegetation with fine leaves; there, eggs are released and fertilized. Eggs have mucous threads with which they are attached to plant material (Foster 1967). McLane (1955) noted that male courtship behavior was observed near clumps of Naias and Vallisneria.

Reproductive strategy: A courting male swims in loops slightly below the female, waiting for the female to respond by stopping. After a female stops, the male moves under her, flicking his head against her throat. The pair moves slowly toward the surface of the water, while the male continues to rub his head against the underside of the female. When they are near the surface, the female swims into vegetation having fine leaves or algal masses and the male follows. Using his dorsal and anal fins, the male then clasps the female, and eggs are released and fertilized (Foster 1967).

Fecundity: 7–46 ripe ova (mean 24.5 per fish) plus numerous smaller ova (McLane 1955); the maximum reported count is 104 (Hildebrand and Schroeder 1928; Hardy 1978). Freshly laid eggs are spherical, nearly colorless, having chorionic threads. Live eggs average 1.23 mm in diameter; eggs hatch in six days at a water temperature of 23.9 degrees C (Foster 1967). More than one brood may be produced per year by a single female (Hardy 1978).

Distribution

The rainwater killifish is native to coastal waters from Massachusetts to Tampico, Mexico (Hubbs et al. 1991). It has been introduced into California, Nevada, Oregon, and Utah (Hubbs and Miller 1965). It is locally abundant in lower Pecos River drainage, New Mexico, not ascending tributary streams far above mouth (Cowley and Sublette 1987).

Species description and etymology
The rainwater killifish was formally described by Spencer Fullerton Baird and Charles Frédéric Girard as Cyprinodon parvus with the type locality given as Beesley's Point, New Jersey and as Greenport, Long Island, New York. The name of the genus, Lucania, is a Native American word from an unknown language and of unknown meaning which presumably Girard liked the sound of. Girard named this species as the type species of the genus Lucania in 1859 but using the junior synonym Limia venusta. The specific name is Latin for "small".

See also
 Killifish (general)

References

 Able, K. W. 1976. Cleaning behavior in the cyprinodontid fishes: Fundulus majalis,  
Cyprinodon variegatus, and Lucania parva. Chesapeake Sci. 17(1):35-39
 Baird, S.F. 1855. Report on the fishes observed on the coasts of New Jersey and Long Island  
during the summer of 1854, pp. 317–353. In: Ninth annual report of the Smithsonian Institution  
(1854). Smithsonian Institution, Washington D.C.
 Baylis, J.R. 1982. Unusual escape response by two cyprinodontiform fishes, and a bluegill  
predator's counter-strategy. Copeia 1982(2):455-457.
 Bonner, T.H., C.Thomas, C.S. Williams, and J.P. Karges. 2005. Temporal assessment of a west  
Texas stream fish assemblage. The Southwestern Naturalist 50(1):74-106.
 Collette, B.B. 1977. Epidermal breeding tubercles and bony contact organs in fishes. Symp.  
Zool. Soc. Lond. 39:225-268.
 Cook, F.A. 1959. Freshwater fishes in Mississippi. Mississippi Game and Fish Commission,  
Jackson. 239 pp.
 Cowley, D.E., and J.E. Sublette. 1987. Distribution of fishes in the Black River drainage,  
Eddy County, New Mexico. Southwestern Naturalist 32(2):213-221.
 Duggins, C.F., Jr. 1980a. Lucania parva (Baird), rainwater killifish, p. 535. In: D. S. Lee,  
et al.  Atlas of North American Fishes.  N. C. State Mus. Nat. Hist., Raleigh, i-r+854 pp.
 Duggins, C.F., Jr. 1980b. Systematics and zoogeography of Lucania parva, Floridichthys, and  
Menidia (Osteichthyes: Atheriniformes) in Florida, the Gulf of Mexico and Yacatan. Dis Abst.  
Int. 41B(3):849-850.
 Edwards, R.J., and S. Contreras-Balderas. 1991. Historical changes in the ichthyofauna of the lower Rio Grande (Rio Bravo del Norte), Texas and Mexico. The Southwestern Naturalist 36 (2):201-212.
 Evermann, B.W. 1899. Report on investigations by the U.S. Fish Commission in Mississippi,  
Louisiana, and Texas, in 1897. Rept. U.S. Fish Comm. 24:287-310.
 Foster, N.R. 1967. Comparative studies on the biology of killifishes (Pisces:  
Cyprinodontidae). Ph.D. diss. Cornell Univ., Ithaca, N.Y. 391 pp.
 Gelwick, F.P., S.Akin, D.A. Arrington, and K.O. Winemiller. 2001. Fish assemblage structure  
in relation to environmental variation in a Texas Gulf Coastal wetland. Estuaries 24(2):285- 
296.
 Gunter, G. 1950. Distributions and abundance of fishes on the Aransas National Wildlife  
Refuge, with life history notes. Publ. Inst. Mar. Sci., Univ. Tex. 1(2):89-101.
 Hardy, J.D., Jr. 1978. Development of Fishes of the Mid-Atlantic Bight: an atlas of egg,  
larval and juvenile stages. Volume 2: Anguillidae through Syngnathidae. U.S. Fish and Wildlife  
Service Biological Services Program, Solomons, Maryland. 458 pp.
 Harrington, R.W., Jr., and E.S. Harrington. 1961. Food selection among fishes invading a  
high subtropical salt marsh; from onset of flooding through the progress of a mosquito brood.  
Ecology 42(4):646-666.
 Hildebrand, S.F., and W.S. Schroeder. 1928. Fishes of Chesapeake Bay. Bulletin of the U.S.  
Bureau of Fisheries 43(1):1-336.
 Hoffman, G.L. 1967. Parasites of North American Freshwater Fishes. University of California  
Press, Berkeley. 486 pp.
 Hubbs, C. 1954. Corrected distributional records for Texas fresh-water. Texas Journal of  
Science 1954(3):277-291.
 Hubbs, C. 1957. Distributional patterns of Texas fresh-water fishes. The Southwestern  
Naturalist 2(2/3):89-104.
 Hubbs,C., and R.R. Miller. 1965. Studies of cyprinodont fishes. XXII. Variation in Lucania  
parva, its establishment in western United States, and description of a new species from  
Interior Basin in Coahuila, Mexico. Misc. Publ. Mus. Zool., Univ. Mich. No.127:1-104.
 Hubbs, C., R.J. Edwards, and G.P. Garrett. 1991. An annotated checklist of the freshwater  
fishes of Texas, with keys to identification of species. Texas Journal of Science, Supplement  
43(4):1-56.
 Jordan, F. 2002. Field and laboratory evaluation of habitat use by rainwater killifish  
(Lucania parva) in the St. John's River estuary, Florida. Estuaries 25(2):288-295.
 Linam, G.W., and L.J. Kleinsasser. 1987a. Fisheries attainability study for Cow Bayou  
(Segment 0511). River Studies Report No. 5. Resource Protection Division. Texas Parks and  
Wildlife Department, Austin. 14 pp.
 Linam, G.W., and L.J. Kleinsasser. 1987b. Fisheries attainability study for Hillebrandt  
Bayou. River Studies Report No. 1. Resource Protection Division. Texas Parks and Wildlife  
Department, Austin. 18 pp.
 McLane, W.M. 1955. Fishes of the St. Johns River System. Ph.D. dissertation. University of  
Florida, Gainesville. 361 pp.
 Miller, C. and V. Guillory. 1980. A comparison of marsh fish communities using the Wegener  
ring. Proc. S.E. Assoc. Fish Wildl. Agencies 34:223-233.
 Peterson, M.S. and S.T. Ross. 1991. Dynamics of littoral fishes and decapods along a coastal  
river-estuarine gradient. Estuarine, Coastal and Shelf Sci. 33:467-483.
 Rhodes, K., and C. Hubbs. 1992. Recovery of Pecos River fishes from a red tide fish kill.  
The Southwestern Naturalist 37(2):178-187.
 Robinson, D.T. 1959. The ichthyofauna of the lower Rio Grande, Texas and Mexico. Copeia  
1959(3):253-256.
 Ross, S.T. 2001. The Inland Fishes of Mississippi. University Press of Mississippi, Jackson.  
624 pp.
 Simpson D.G., and G. Gunter. 1956. Notes on habitats, systematic characters and life  
histories of Texas saltwater cyprinodontes. Tulane Stud. Zool. 4(4):115-134.
 Sublette, J.E., M.D. Hatch, and M. Sublette. 1990. The Fishes of New Mexico. University of  
New Mexico Press, Albuquerque. 393 pp.
 Tyler, A.V. 1963. Cleaning symbiosis between the stickleback and rainwater fish. Underwater  
Naturalist 1(4):18-19.
 Warren, M.L., Jr., B.M. Burr, S.J. Walsh, H.L. Bart, Jr., R.C. Cashner, D.A. Etnier, B.J.  
Freeman, B.R. Kuhajda, R.L. Mayden, H.W. Robison, S.T. Ross, and W.C. Starnes. 2000.  
Diversity, Distribution, and Conservation status of the native freshwater fishes of the  
southern United States. Fisheries 25(10):7-29.

Lucania (fish)
Fish of the Eastern United States
Fish of the Gulf of Mexico
Fish of the Western Atlantic
Fish described in 1855